Archicolliuris is a genus of beetles in the family Carabidae, containing the following species:

 Archicolliuris albicolon Bates, 1892 
 Archicolliuris benoiti Basilewsky, 1974 
 Archicolliuris bimaculata L. Redtenbacher, 1844
 Archicolliuris birmanica (Liebke, 1938) 
 Archicolliuris burgeoni (Liebke, 1931) 
 Archicolliuris butonensis (Kirschenhofer, 1996) 
 Archicolliuris cribricollis (Andrewes, 1929) 
 Archicolliuris dimidiata (Chaudoir, 1848) 
 Archicolliuris distigma (Chaudoir, 1850) 
 Archicolliuris fasciata Laferte-Senectere, 1849 
 Archicolliuris gibbosa Basilewsky, 1970 
 Archicolliuris immaculata (Liebke, 1938) 
 Archicolliuris kodadai (Kirschenhofer, 1996) 
 Archicolliuris linea (Andrewes, 1926) 
 Archicolliuris occipitalis Baehr, 2005 
 Archicolliuris olsoufieffi (Alluaud, 1935) 
 Archicolliuris opacipennis (Gestro, 1888) 
 Archicolliuris papua (Darlington, 1968)  
 Archicolliuris par (Darlington, 1968) 
 Archicolliuris philippinensis (Donabauer, 1996) 
 Archicolliuris rubripes (Andrewes, 1926) 
 Archicolliuris rudicollis (Fairmaire, 1898) 
 Archicolliuris rufopicea (Chaudoir, 1862) 
 Archicolliuris senegalensis (Lepeletier & Audinet-Serville, 1825) 
 Archicolliuris splendissimus Baehr, 2005 
 Archicolliuris subnitida (Liebke, 1933) 
 Archicolliuris tenuis (Andrewes, 1926) 
 Archicolliuris tetraspilota (Schmidt-Goebel, 1846)

References

Lebiinae